The Institute of Law is a law research establishment, founded in 1991 by the Government of the Republic of Lithuania seeking to coordinate the reform of the legal system and law institutions, to combine it with the economic and social reorganization carried in the country. The founder of the Institute is the Ministry of Justice of the Republic of Lithuania. The main areas of research interests of the Law Institute are as follows: public law (paying most attention to the problems of criminal law, constitutional law and criminal justice) and criminology.

Functions 
The Institute performs the following functions while trying to achieve its aims:
 Carries the applied scientific researches of the legal system;
Collects, analyses, systematizes and provides the state institutions with the legal and criminological information;
 Carries the legal and criminological expertise of laws and other legal acts as well as draft legal acts.

Governance 
Past acting directors: 
 1991–1992 Juozas Galginaitis
 1992-2002 Antanas Dapšys
 2002-2009 Algimantas Čepas 
 2009-2010 Petras Ragauskas
 2010-2012  Algimantas Čepas
 2012-2013: Margarita Dobrynina
 2013: Algimantas Čepas
 since 2014: Jurgita Paužaitė-Kulvinskienė

References

External  links
  Institute (en, lt)

Research institutes in Lithuania
Legal education in Lithuania
Organizations based in Vilnius
1991 establishments in Lithuania
Legal research institutes